TVI Pacific Inc. (TVI) is a Canadian mining company headquartered in Calgary. TVI's Canatuan mines were the first foreign-invested mine in the Philippines after the passage of the Philippine Mining Act of 1995.

President and CEO of TVI is geologist and business executive Clifford M. James.

TVI owns 30.66% of TVI Resource Development (Phils.) Inc. (TVIRD), a resource company established in 2014 that mines for nickel laterite ore, gold, and silver. Another recent project is the Cirianiu gold project located in the Macuata Province of northern Vanua Levu Island of the Fijis.

In 2015 TVI was mentioned along with several other mining companies as being the likely beneficiary of a series of government-funded murders of the indigenous Lumads who live in the Mindanao region of the Philippines, an area rich in mineral resources to which these companies would like better access.

See also
 Timuay Lucenio Manda

External links
http://web.tmxmoney.com/company.php?qm_symbol=TVI
Home Page

References

Mining in the Philippines
Mining companies of Canada